Baška (1247 Terra Pousa, Bosk,  Bayan, 1399 Bosk, Bask, 1427 Baask, 1612 Bosko, Boska) is a village and municipality in the Košice-okolie District of the Kosice Region in eastern Slovakia.

Etymology
The name comes from the Slavic personal name Božk, Božek or Božka (derived from bog: god), the older theory proposed by Ján Stanislav is also Bašek.

History
The village was first mentioned in 1247. During this period, it belonged to the Abov (Abó) family local branch. In 1427 it belonged to the Frank family of Šemša. In 1447 the village was bought by Captain Peter from Zips(Spiš) county. In 1580 it became a part of the town of Myslava, and during this period the exploitation of local wood began. From 1939 to 1944 it became part of Hungary again.

Geography
The village lies at an altitude of 350 metres and covers an area of 4.502 km².
It has a population of about 325 people.

Genealogical resources

The records for genealogical research are available at the state archive "Statny Archiv in Kosice, Slovakia"

 Roman Catholic church records (births/marriages/deaths): 1788-1897 (parish B)
 Greek Catholic church records (births/marriages/deaths): 1850-1911 (parish B)

See also
 List of municipalities and towns in Slovakia

References

External links

Surnames of living people in Baska

Villages and municipalities in Košice-okolie District